Joe McDermott (born 17 September 1940) is an Irish-American professional golfer.

Born and raised in County Clare, Ireland, McDermott moved to the United States in the 1960s. He won the Chicago City Amateur twice, the Cook County Amateur twice and the Midwest Amateur three times before turning pro in 1968.

McDermott also won the 1977 New Mexico Open as well as multiple PGA sectional events before qualifying for the European Seniors Tour at the Qualifying School in 1997. He may be best known for winning the 1998 AIB Irish Seniors Open at Woodbrook. During the tournament he shot a hole-in-one on the 13th hole during the final round. He also shot an ace at the 2001 Wales Seniors Open.

Professional wins (1)

European Senior Tour wins (1)

European Senior Tour playoff record (1–0)

References

External links

Irish male golfers
American male golfers
European Senior Tour golfers
Golfers from Chicago
Irish emigrants to the United States
Sportspeople from County Clare
People from Kilrush
1940 births
Living people